Shorewood High School may refer to:

Shorewood High School (Washington), located in Shoreline, Washington
Shorewood High School (Wisconsin), located in Shorewood, Wisconsin